George M. Palmer (born September 20, 1857) was an American lawyer and politician from New York.

Life
He was born on September 20, 1857, in Richmondville, Schoharie County, New York, the son of James Palmer (died 1906). He attended the public schools, and graduated from the State Normal College in 1877. He studied law, was admitted to the bar in 1882, and practiced law in Cobleskill.

Palmer was a member of the New York State Assembly (Schoharie Co.) in 1897, 1898 and 1899; and was Minority Leader in 1899.

He was again a member of the State Assembly in 1902, 1903, 1904, 1905 and 1906; and was Minority Leader from 1902 to 1906. On July 14, 1906, he married Mary Corry. On October 2, 1906, he ran for re-nomination but, because of his opposition to William Randolph Hearst, Palmer was defeated at the Democratic county convention by Charles H. Holmes.

Palmer was again a member of the State Assembly in 1908; and was Minority Leader. At the New York state election, 1908, he ran on the Democratic ticket for New York Attorney General, but was defeated by Republican Edward R. O'Malley.

On February 16, 1912, Palmer was elected as Chairman of the New York State Democratic Committee. On January 30, 1914, Palmer denied that he would step down as State Chairman. On February 19, he announced his resignation, to take effect on March 2 when William Church Osborn should be elected as his successor. At the same time he stated that he expected to be appointed as Counsel to the New York State Workmen's Compensation Commission. The deal fell through when on August 13, 1914, Jeremiah F. Connor was appointed as Counsel.

Sources

1857 births
Year of death missing
People from Cobleskill, New York
Democratic Party members of the New York State Assembly
People from Richmondville, New York